WKRL may refer to:

WKRL-FM, a radio station in Syracuse, New York
Western Kentucky Railway